Christine Molloy, is a UK-based artist known for her works of theatre, interactive art, and film.

Life and career 
Molloy was born in Dublin, Ireland. She studied theatre in the late 1980s at Dartington College of Arts, UK, alongside her partner Joe Lawlor. They both graduated in 1992. Since then Molloy and Lawlor have together made works of theatre, interactive art, and film, as creative partnership Desperate Optimists which also became the name of their production company. In a 2016 article in Sight and Sound, Sophie Mayer described their filmmaking process as 'a unique merging of community arts (with months spent developing relationships and stories) and vérité documentary'.

Please see the Desperate Optimists page for a list of works created with Joe Lawlor.

References

Theatre people from Dublin (city)
20th-century Irish women
Living people
Year of birth missing (living people)